Elixir is a functional, concurrent, high-level general-purpose programming language that runs on the BEAM virtual machine, which is also used to implement the Erlang programming language. Elixir builds on top of Erlang and shares the same abstractions for building distributed, fault-tolerant applications. Elixir also provides tooling and an extensible design. The latter is supported by compile-time metaprogramming with macros and polymorphism via protocols.

Elixir is used by companies such as Ramp, PagerDuty, Discord, Brex, E-MetroTel, Pinterest, Moz, Bleacher Report, The Outline, Inverse, Divvy, FarmBot and for building embedded systems. The community organizes yearly events in the United States, Europe, and Japan, as well as minor local events and conferences.

History 
José Valim is the creator of the Elixir programming language, a research and development project created at Plataformatec. His goals were to enable higher extensibility and productivity in the Erlang VM while maintaining compatibility with Erlang's ecosystem.

Elixir was aimed at large-scale sites and apps. Elixir uses features of Ruby, Erlang, and Clojure to develop a "high-concurrency" and "low-latency" language. Elixir was designed to handle large data volumes. Elixir is used in the telecommunication, eCommerce, and finance industries.

On July 12, 2018, Honeypot released a mini-documentary on Elixir.

Versioning 
Elixir mostly follows semantic versioning and has only 1 major version with no plans for a second. Each of the minor versions supports a specific range of Erlang/OTP versions.

Features 
 Compiles to bytecode for the BEAM virtual machine of Erlang. Full interoperability with Erlang code, without runtime impact.
 Scalability and fault-tolerance, thanks to Erlang's lightweight concurrency mechanisms
 Built-in tooling for managing dependencies, code compilation, running tests, formatting code, remote debugging and more.
 An interactive REPL inside running programs, including Phoenix web servers, with code reloading and access to internal state
 Everything is an expression
 Pattern matching to promote assertive code
 Type hints for static analysis tools
 Immutable data, with an emphasis, like other functional languages, on recursion and higher-order functions instead of side-effect-based looping
 Shared nothing concurrent programming via message passing (actor model)
 Lazy and async collections with streams
 Railway oriented programming via the with construct
 Hygienic metaprogramming by direct access to the abstract syntax tree (AST). Libraries often implement small domain-specific languages, such as for databases or testing. 
 Code execution at compile time. The Elixir compiler also runs on the BEAM, so modules that are being compiled can immediately run code which has already been compiled.
 Polymorphism via a mechanism called protocols. Dynamic dispatch, as in Clojure, however, without multiple dispatch because Elixir protocols dispatch on a single type.
 Support for documentation via Python-like docstrings in the Markdown formatting language
 Unicode support and UTF-8 strings

Examples 
The following examples can be run in an iex shell or saved in a file and run from the command line by typing elixir <filename>.

Classic Hello world example:

iex> IO.puts("Hello World!")
Hello World!

Pipe operator:
iex> "Elixir" |> String.graphemes() |> Enum.frequencies()
%{"E" => 1, "i" => 2, "l" => 1, "r" => 1, "x" => 1}

iex> %{values: 1..5} |> Map.get(:values) |> Enum.map(& &1 * 2)
[2, 4, 6, 8, 10]

iex> |> Enum.sum()
30
Pattern matching (a.k.a. destructuring):
iex> %{left: x} = %{left: 5, right: 8}
iex> x
5

iex> {:ok, [_ | rest]} = {:ok, [1, 2, 3]}
iex> rest
[2, 3]

Pattern matching with multiple clauses:
iex> case File.read("path/to/file") do
iex>   {:ok, contents} -> IO.puts("found file: #{contents}")
iex>   {:error, reason} -> IO.puts("missing file: #{reason}")
iex> end

List comprehension:
iex> for n <- 1..5, rem(n, 2) == 1, do: n*n
[1, 9, 25]

Asynchronously reading files with streams:
1..5
|> Task.async_stream(&File.read!("#{&1}.txt"))
|> Stream.filter(fn {:ok, contents} -> String.trim(contents) != "" end)
|> Enum.join("\n")

Multiple function bodies with guards:
def fib(n) when n in [0, 1], do: n
def fib(n), do: fib(n-2) + fib(n-1)

Relational databases with the Ecto library:
schema "weather" do
  field :city     # Defaults to type :string
  field :temp_lo, :integer
  field :temp_hi, :integer
  field :prcp,    :float, default: 0.0
end

Weather |> where(city: "Kraków") |> order_by(:temp_lo) |> limit(10) |> Repo.all

Sequentially spawning a thousand processes:
for num <- 1..1000, do: spawn fn -> IO.puts("#{num * 2}") end

Asynchronously performing a task:
task = Task.async fn -> perform_complex_action() end
other_time_consuming_action()
Task.await task

Noteworthy Elixir projects 
 Mix is a build automation tool that provides tasks for creating, compiling, and testing Elixir projects, managing its dependencies, and more.
 Phoenix is a web development framework written in Elixir which implements the server-side Model View Controller (MVC) pattern.

See also 

 Concurrent computing
 Distributed computing

References

External links 
 Elixir language website

Concurrent programming languages
Functional languages
Pattern matching programming languages
Programming languages
Programming languages created in 2012
Software using the Apache license